"Don't Miss You" is the first single from English singer-songwriter Amy Pearson's debut album, Who I Am (2008). It charted at number 19 on the Australian ARIA Singles Chart.

Lyrical themes
According to Pearson, the song was inspired as a result of a long-distance relationship breakup. To her, the song is about moving on from a lost relationship, letting go of what one does not need and being resilient.

Track listing
'''Australian CD single
 "Don't Miss You"
 "Love Like This"
 "Don't Miss You" (Ra.D remix)
 "Don't Miss You" (a cappella)

Chart performance
"Don't Miss You" debuted on the Australian ARIA Singles Chart at number 28 on 10 June 2007. After six weeks inside the top 30, it climbed to its peak of 19 on 22 July 2007.

Weekly charts

Year-end charts

References

2007 debut singles
2007 songs
Amy Pearson songs
Song recordings produced by DNA Songs
Songs written by Amy Pearson
Songs written by Anthony Egizii
Songs written by David Musumeci
Sony BMG singles